The 2013–14 I liga was the sixth season of the Polish I liga under its current title, and the sixty-sixth season of the second highest division in the Polish football league system. The season began on 27 July 2013 and concluded on 7 June 2014.

According to the competition rules, all clubs are required to field at least one youth player (born on 1993 or later and Polish or trained in Poland) in every game (except for the times when the only youth player on the roster is sent off or unable to continue playing).

Changes from last season
The following teams have changed division since the 2012-13 season.

To I liga
Promoted from II liga East
 Puszcza Niepołomice
 Wisła Płock
Promoted from II liga West
 Chojniczanka Chojnice
 Energetyk ROW Rybnik
Relegated from Ekstraklasa
 GKS Bełchatów

From I liga
Relegated to II liga West
 Polonia Bytom
 Warta Poznań
Demoted
 ŁKS Łódź
Promoted to Ekstraklasa
 KS Cracovia
 Zawisza Bydgoszcz

Notes
 ŁKS Łódź were demoted from 2012–13 I liga as they withdrew from the competition after playing 20 out of 34 games. A successor club AP ŁKS Łódź competes in 2013–14 Łódź IV liga.
 Before the start of the season GKS Bogdanka returned to their former name Górnik Łęczna.

Teams
Of the 18 participating teams, 13 remain following the 2012–13 I liga. They are joined by four teams promoted from the 2012–13 II liga and one relegated from the 2012–13 Ekstraklasa.

On 8 June 2013, Puszcza and Wisła Płock were promoted to the I liga from the eastern group of II liga after Pelikan Łowicz's 2–1 loss to Stal Rzeszów. A day later, Energetyk ROW and Chojniczanka joined them as champions and runners-up of II liga West following  Bytovia's 4–0 loss to MKS Kluczbork.

On 28 May 2013 the PZPN announced their final decision that highly indebted Polonia Warsaw will be demoted from Ekstraklasa. Had they improved their financial situation, Polonia would be  eligible to play in 2013–14 I liga. However, the club again failed to meet the Polish FA's financial criteria and will play in the North Mazovia IV liga. As a result, the 15th placed teams of the 2012–13 Ekstraklasa (Ruch Chorzów) and the 2012–13 I liga (Okocimski KS Brzesko) avoided relegation.

On 2 June 2013, GKS Bełchatów were relegated from the Ekstraklasa despite winning the final game against Piast Gliwice, as the other relegation threatened team Podbeskidzie Bielsko-Biała defeated Widzew Łódź 2–1.

Team overview

Stadia and locations

 Okocimski played 1 home game at Stadion Suche Stawy (cap. 7,000) in Kraków.
 Puszcza played 1 home game at Stadion Suche Stawy (cap. 7,000) in Kraków.
 Stomil played 1 home game at Stadion OSiR (cap. 4,998) in Ostróda.

Personnel and sponsoring

League table

Results

Season statistics

Top goalscorers

References 

Pol
2013–14 in Polish football
I liga seasons